The Cosmocercidae are a nematode family in the superfamily Cosmoceroidea.

Genera 
Genera within the family Cosmocercidae include:
 Cosmocercoides Wilkie, 1930
 Nemhelix Morand & Petter, 1986 - with the only species Nemhelix bakeri Morand & Petter, 1986
 Aplectana, with 42 species, type: Aplectana herediaensis

References

External links 

 
Nematode families